Mideopsis is a genus of mites belonging to the family Mideopsidae.

The species of this genus are found in Europe, Africa, Japan and Northern America.

Species:
 Mideopsis americana Marshall, 1940 
 Mideopsis biverrucata Viets

References

Trombidiformes
Trombidiformes genera